Live Performance is a live album by Jake Thackray. Recorded at the Queen Elizabeth Hall in London in 1970, it was released on LP by EMI in 1971 and reissued in 1976. An expanded version was released on CD in 2006.

Thackray was uncomfortable performing in large venues, and his socialist left-wing politics meant he could not understand why people would pay money to see him perform. He almost backed out of this concert, feeling he had no right to entertain such a large crowd, but producer Norman Newell managed to persuade him to go on. This wasn’t the last time this would happen; before a concert in 1977, Thackray’s agent Alex Armitage allegedly intercepted Thackray already in his car leaving the venue.

LP track listing

CD track listing

References

External links
LP Track listing and sleeve notes at jakethackray.com

Jake Thackray albums
1971 live albums
EMI Records live albums
Albums produced by Norman Newell